Nemaha is a city in Sac County, Iowa, United States. The population was 66 at the time of the 2020 census.

Geography
Nemaha is located at  (42.514999, -95.089332).

Demographics

2010 census
As of the census of 2010, there were 85 people, 33 households, and 23 families living in the city. The racial makeup of the city was 88.2% White, 3.5% African American, 1.2% Asian, and 7.1% from other races. Hispanic or Latino of any race were 12.9% of the population.

There were 33 households, of which 30.3% had children under the age of 18 living with them, 54.5% were married couples living together, 9.1% had a female householder with no husband present, 6.1% had a male householder with no wife present, and 30.3% were non-families. 24.2% of all households were made up of individuals, and 6% had someone living alone who was 65 years of age or older. The average household size was 2.58 and the average family size was 3.13.

The median age in the city was 39.5 years. 29.4% of residents were under the age of 18; 5.8% were between the ages of 18 and 24; 24.7% were from 25 to 44; 28.3% were from 45 to 64; and 11.8% were 65 years of age or older. The gender makeup of the city was 56.5% male and 43.5% female.

2000 census
As of the census of 2000, there were 102 people, 42 households, and 25 families living in the city. The racial makeup of the city was 97.06% White, 0.98% Native American, and 1.96% from two or more races.

There were 42 households, out of which 35.7% had children under the age of 18 living with them, 54.8% were married couples living together, 4.8% had a female householder with no husband present, and 38.1% were non-families. 28.6% of all households were made up of individuals, and 9.5% had someone living alone who was 65 years of age or older. The average household size was 2.43 and the average family size was 3.08.

In the city, the population was spread out, with 26.5% under the age of 18, 7.8% from 18 to 24, 27.5% from 25 to 44, 24.5% from 45 to 64, and 13.7% who were 65 years of age or older. The median age was 38 years. For every 100 females, there were 131.8 males. For every 100 females age 18 and over, there were 120.6 males.

The median income for a household in the city was $27,708, and the median income for a family was $31,250. Males had a median income of $21,250 versus $28,125 for females. The per capita income for the city was $11,997. There were 8.3% of families and 9.5% of the population living below the poverty line, including no under eighteens and none of those over 64.

Education
Nemaha became now part of the Ridge View School District as of 2010, which formed when the Galva-Holstein and Schaller-Crestland school districts merged. Previously, it was a part of the Schaller-Crestland Community School District. The district formed on July 1, 1993, by the merger of the Schaller Community School District and the Crestland Community School District.

Before the merger with Crestland in 1958, Nemaha was an independent school district. They were known as the Blue Jays.

References

Cities in Iowa
Cities in Sac County, Iowa